James Victor Gbeho (born 12 January 1935, in Keta, Ghana) is a  Ghanaian lawyer and diplomat who was President of the ECOWAS Commission from 2010 to 2012, to which position he was unanimously elected at the 37th Summit of the Authority of Heads of State and Government of the 15 Member States.

He was Ghana's Minister of Foreign Affairs from 1997 to 2001, under President Jerry Rawlings, and he was the Member of Parliament for the Anlo constituency from January 2001 to January 2005.

He was subsequently a foreign policy advisor to the government of President John Atta Mills.

Before his retirement as a career diplomat and politician, Gbeho worked in the Ghana Foreign and Commonwealth Service and served in various capacities at Ghana's diplomatic missions abroad. His postings included the Ghana missions in China, India, Nigeria, Germany, United Kingdom and Switzerland.

Gbeho was Deputy High Commissioner to the Court of St. James's (UK) from 1972 until 1976, Ambassador and Permanent Representative of Ghana to the European offices of the United Nations in Geneva (1978–80), with concurrent accreditation to UNIDO in Vienna, Austria, and was Ghana's Permanent Representative to the United Nations in New York City from 1980 to 1990, concurrently accredited to Cuba, Jamaica, and to Trinidad and Tobago.

In July 1994, the UN Secretary-General appointed him as special representative to Somalia. In September 1995 Jerry Rawlings, as chairman of ECOWAS, appointed Gbeho as ECOWAS special representative for Liberia.

Education 
Educated at Achimota School, he is the son of Philip Gbeho, arranger of the national anthem of Ghana, and the uncle of journalist Komla Dumor.

Politics
Victor Gbeho was the member of parliament of the Anlo constituency in the 3rd parliament of the 4th republic of Ghana as an independent candidate.

Elections
He was elected as the member of parliament for the Anlo constituency in the 2000 Ghanaian general elections, for which he was an independent candidate. His constituency was the second independent candidate to win the said election in the Volta Region.

Gbeho was elected with 19,083 votes out of 28,156 total valid votes cast. This was equivalent to 68.2% of the total valid votes cast.

He was elected over Clend M. Kwasi Sowu of the National Democratic Congress, Esther llan A. Nyamalor an independent candidate, Godwin Kwaku Defeamekpor of the New Patriotic Party, Clemence Kwami Abotsi of the Convention People's Party, Cornelius Kofi Binewoatsor of the National Reformed Party, Prince Richard Abotsi of the United Ghana Movement, and independent candidate Goyimwole Enukomeko Kpodo. These obtained 4,223, 3,800, 327, 249, 162, 118 and 0 votes respectively out of the total valid votes cast. These were equivalent to 15.1%, 13.6%, 1.2%, 0.9%, 0.6% and 0.4% respectively of total valid votes cast.

References

External links
African Green Revolution Forum

1935 births
Living people
Alumni of Achimota School
Ewe people
Foreign ministers of Ghana
Gbeho family
Ghanaian Roman Catholics
Ghanaian civil servants
Ghanaian diplomats
Ghanaian MPs 2001–2005
High Commissioners of Ghana to the United Kingdom
National Democratic Congress (Ghana) politicians
People from Volta Region
Permanent Representatives of Ghana to the United Nations